Júlia Vasconcelos (born 15 June 1992) is a taekwondo competitor from Brazil. She participated in the 2013 and 2015 world championships and qualified for the 2016 Summer Olympics in the 57 kg division.

References

1992 births
Living people
Taekwondo practitioners at the 2016 Summer Olympics
Olympic taekwondo practitioners of Brazil
Brazilian female taekwondo practitioners
Taekwondo practitioners at the 2015 Pan American Games
Pan American Games competitors for Brazil
Brazilian LGBT sportspeople
Lesbian sportswomen
LGBT taekwondo practitioners
People from São José dos Campos
Sportspeople from São Paulo (state)
21st-century Brazilian women